The 2019 PSL All-Filipino Conference was the third conference and second indoor tournament for the Philippine Super Liga's seventh season. The games began on June 15, 2019, at the Filoil Flying V Centre, San Juan and will end as soon as there is a winner.

Teams

Preliminary round

Team standings	

|}

Point system:
3 points = win match in 3 or 4 sets
2 points = win match in 5 sets
1 point  = lose match in 5 sets
0 point  = lose match in 3 or 4 sets

Match results

 All times are in Philippines Standard Time (UTC+08:00)

First round

 
 
 
 
 
 

|}

Match results
All times are in Philippines Standard Time (UTC+08:00)

Second round

|}

Playoffs

Quarterfinals

|}

Semifinals

|}

Bronze match

|}

Finals
Best-of-three series

|}

Final standing

Special Awards 

 Glorious Blend Mix Volleyball Jam - Cherry Rondina (Petron Blaze Spikers)
 Ms. Sweet and Fit Stevia - Mika Reyes (Petron Blaze Spikers)
 Ms. Glorious Blend Coffee - Jovelyn Gonzaga (Cignal HD Spikers)

Individual Awards

Venues
Filoil Flying V Centre (main venue)
Smart Araneta Coliseum (finals)
Mall of Asia Arena (finals)

"Spike on Tour" venues
 Muntinlupa Sports Complex - Muntinlupa 
 Strike Gymnasium - Bacoor City
 Cadiz Arena - Cadiz City 
 Natalio G. Velez Sports & Cultural Center - Silay City
 Ynares Center - Antipolo
 Caloocan Sports Complex - Caloocan
 Quezon Convention Center - Lucena City 
 Malolos Sports & Convention Center - Malolos City
 Imus Sports Center
 Corpus Christi Gymnasium - Cagayan de Oro City

Broadcast Partners
ESPN 5: 5 Plus, One Sports (SD and HD), ESPN5.com, ESPN Player (Online)

References

Philippine Super Liga
PSL